The Thin Blue Line is a 1966 film directed by William Friedkin. It was the second of three documentaries Friedkin made for producer David Wolper. It focuses on the police force, and the experience making it influenced Friedkin on The French Connection.

See also
List of American films of 1966

References

Friedkin, William, The Friedkin Connection, Harper Collins 2013

External links

The Thin Blue Line at David L. Wolper

1966 films
1966 documentary films
Films directed by William Friedkin
Documentary films about law enforcement in the United States
American documentary television films
1966 television films
1960s American films